The 1902 VFL Grand Final was an Australian rules football game contested between the Collingwood Football Club and Essendon Football Club, held at the Melbourne Cricket Ground in Melbourne on 20 September 1902. It was the 5th annual Grand Final of the Victorian Football League, staged to determine the premiers for the 1902 VFL season. The match, attended by 35,202 spectators, was won by Collingwood by a margin of 33 points, marking that club's first premiership victory.

Teams

 Umpire - Henry "Ivo" Crapp

Statistics

Goalkickers

Collingwood:
 T Lockwood 3
 T Rowell 3
 J Allan 1
 G Angus 1
 H Pears 1

Essendon:
 F Hiskins 1
 P O'Loughlin 1
 A Thurgood 1

See also
 1902 VFL season

VFL/AFL Grand Finals
Grand
Collingwood Football Club
Essendon Football Club
September 1902 sports events